Stephen Mulholland (born August 5, 1960) is a Canadian surgeon and scholar with an expertise in plastic and reconstructive surgery, and a former professional ice hockey player. He is considered an expert in plastic surgery and has been called on to testify in disciplinary hearings involving botched procedures, and has appeared on television shows which include The Today Show, The Doctors, The View and The Other Half. Mulholland is the founder of SpaMedica, an aesthetic plastic surgery center located in Toronto. He is best known for non-invasive practices, including the Pan G., Facelift and the Bodytite for which he owns or has developed and assigned the patents. As of 2021, Mulholland has retired from plastic surgery and moved to London, UK, where he focuses on growing two medical aesthetic specialty companies, InMode and BoomerangFX, of which he is a co-founder and stakeholder.

Early life, education, and hockey career

Born in West Vancouver, British Columbia, Mulholland attended Lake Superior State University on a hockey scholarship, playing as a forward and becoming Central Collegiate Hockey Association Rookie of the Year for the 1979–1980 season. Over the course of his collegiate career, he was a four-time CCHA All-Star and NCAA All-American. Mulholland "led the [LSSU] Lakers in scoring during all four years", becoming "the only player to accomplish that feat at LSSU and NCAA Division 1 Hockey". During all 4 seasons that he played at LSSU, he was the highest goal-scorer, finishing his collegiate career with a 206-point total surpassed only by Jim Dowd and Sean Tallaire. Mulholland "also excelled in the classroom" throughout this time, "earning CCHA All-Academic honors in 1980-81, 1981-82 and 1982-83; and was also an Academic All-American in 1982-83". In 2016, Mulholland was named to the 1976-86 Laker Hockey All-Decade Team as part of the 50th anniversary of the school's hockey program, receiving the most fan ballots for a forward in that decade.

After graduating, Mulholland played professional hockey during the 1983–1984 with Rögle BK in the Swedish Elite series. With Rögle BK, in Sweden, he played in 28 regular season games and two playoff games, scoring 49 points off 32 goals and 17 assists during the regular season, leading the South Division in scoring and one point off an assist in the playoffs. After Rögle BK, Mulholland signed as free agent with the NHL Calgary Flames, playing for their Central Hockey League affiliate farm team, the Colorado Flames. Following that season, he retired from the sport and returned to school to pursue his medical degree and become a physician.

Mulholland attended the University of Toronto Medical School where he graduated in 1988. He completed his general and plastic surgery training at the University of Toronto and became certified by the Royal College of Physicians and Surgeons of Canada in 1994.

Career

Mulholland began his career as a consultant for St. Joseph's Hospital in Hamilton, Ontario where he worked on reconstruction of faces and necks where tumors were removed. Mulholland's work in plastic surgery has included reconstructive, craniofacial trauma, and cancer surgery. He has invented different procedures for each, including transplanting sensate tissue into oral cavities defects after the removal of tongue and jawbone tissue. He also developed the OsteoCutaneous Skin Flap procedure, an auto-transplant procedure where the tibia and skin from the back of the foot is transplanted by re-connecting all the small arteries, veins and nerves using a microscope. The procedure is also used for reconstruction of cancer jaw bone and mouth lining defects. His work is also widely published in medical journals and he has authored numerous books and book chapters on the subject.
 
In 1997, Mulholland began focusing on aesthetic plastic surgery. He founded SpaMedica, an aesthetic spa located in Toronto where he provides non-invasive techniques such as Botox injections, Fillers, Radiofrequency, Skin Care and laser treatments. Mulholland is best known for his non-surgical facelift techniques, including the Pan G., ThreadLift, FaceTite, AccuTite and Morpheus 8 treatment, which he launched over the years from 2000-2015.
 
Mulholland is a frequent speaker and lecturer, appearing as a regular guest expert plastic surgeon on CityLine and Breakfast Television. He has also appeared as a plastic and cosmetic surgery expert on the CBC, CTV, Rogers TV, Global Television Network and in newspapers and magazines such as the Toronto Star, The Globe and Mail, Fashion Magazine, Flare and Elle Canada. Mulholland has also appeared on The Real Housewives of Toronto, where his wife Ann Kaplan Mulholland was one of the main cast members for season one of the show.

As of May 2021, Mulholland has shifted from working as one of Canada’s top plastic surgeons to his work with two companies, InMode and BoomerangFX. He is the co-founder of InMode, which manufactures electrosurgical devices and aesthetic enhancement products for medical specialists. InMode is a multibillion-dollar and publicly traded worldwide manufacturing company that went public in 2019. Working with the InMode R&D team, Dr. Mulholland helps develop non-invasive technologies based on proprietary radiofrequency-assisted lipolysis and deep subdermal fractional radiofrequency, such as the Morpheus 8, Fractora, BodyTite, FaceTite and AccuTite.

In 2021, Mulholland co-founded BoomerangFX, a software as a service (SaaS) company operating in the private health sector. Boomerang FX is a fully integrated, cloud-based Practice Management, Lead Generation and Online Learning service using artificial intelligence (AI), which Mulholland and his partners market to specialties such as dermatology, medical spa services, cosmetic surgery, and hair restoration. The software is a paid search, Biztech, and EDtech service aiding private medical specialties across Canada and the United States with practice management, marketing, and fully integrated Paid Search advertising and Lead Generation as well as Machine Learning powered Customer Retention Management and a client facing reward APP.

References

External links
 
 SpaMedica official website
 Stephen Mulholland on Google Scholar

1960 births
Canadian expatriate ice hockey players in Sweden
Canadian ice hockey forwards
Canadian plastic surgeons
Colorado Flames players
Lake Superior State Lakers men's ice hockey players
Lake Superior State University alumni
Living people
Rögle BK players